Felicia Forrester is a fictional character from the CBS Daytime soap opera The Bold and the Beautiful. Originally portrayed by actress Colleen Dion-Scotti, the role was portrayed on-off Lesli Kay from November 2005 to 2014, with a brief reappearance in September 2016.

Felicia is known as the black sheep of the Forrester family. The youngest daughter of Stephanie (Susan Flannery) and Eric Forrester (John McCook), Felicia has one brother, Thorne (Winsor Harmon), and one sister, Kristen Forrester (Terri Ann Linn, Tracy Melchior). She had another sister, Angela who is deceased. She also has three half-siblings: Ridge (Thorsten Kaye), Rick (Jacob Young), and Bridget (Ashley Jones). She is affectionately known as Fifi, a name bestowed on her by her mother's friend, Sally Spectra (Darlene Conley).

Kay's performance in the role earned her a nomination for the Daytime Emmy Award for Outstanding Supporting Actress in a Drama Series in 2007. In March and April 2008, the character made her first crossover to the series' sister series, The Young and the Restless.

Casting and conception 
The role of Felicia Forrester was originally cast with actress Colleen Dion-Scotti in 1989; first appearing on January 15, 1990. Dion-Scotti remained until 1992 but briefly returned in 1997. In May 2004, it was announced that Dion-Scotti was again returning in an attempt to "reinvent" the Forresters. That September, the actress was bumped to recurring status due to the actress' commute between the east coast and the west coast, where the series films. In October, the actress announced that she would be exiting the series once again. Her final appearance was on December 4, 2004.

In October 2005, it was announced that another daytime veteran actress, Lesli Kay, had been hired as a recast Felicia. Kay was best known for her roles as Molly Conlan on As the World Turns, and also known as Lois Cerullo on General Hospital. Her first airdate as Felicia was November 30, 2005, opposite Taylor Hayes (Hunter Tylo).

In 2008, it was announced that Kay would crossover to The Young and the Restless, in what was considered to be a semi-permanent basis. Kay's crossover to Y&R was short-lived and she returned to her home series. In 2009, it was announced that Kay would make history in becoming the first actress to hold two roles on two separate coasts, when she was announced to be returning to the role of Molly on As the World Turns, while maintaining her role as Felicia. Following the cancellation of As the World Turns, Kay continued appearing on B&B.

In August 2014, Kay reprised her role as Felicia for one episode of The Bold and the Beautiful. A TV Soap reporter said that Kay had no more upcoming appearances scheduled. On September 2, 2016, it was announced that Kay would again reprise her portrayal of Felicia on September 22, 23, and 26.

Storylines

1990s
Soon after Felicia's arrival in Los Angeles in 1990, she forged ill-fated relationships with Jake MacClaine (Todd McKee) and Zach Hamilton (Michael Watson). She left town in 1992, but returned in 1994 but left town again. Felicia returned in 1997 for her parents' wedding (which was called off when Eric's affair with Lauren Fenmore (Tracey E. Bregman) was exposed).  After Ridge was arrested for shooting Grant Chambers (Charles Grant), Felicia tried to help exonerate him and then attempted to help him reunite with his wife, Dr. Taylor Hayes (Hunter Tylo). She was unsuccessful on both counts, and soon left town again.

2000s
After seven years overseas, Felicia returned in July 2004. She quickly began an affair with Nick Marone (Jack Wagner), who soon discovered that Felicia had colon cancer. She had medical tests run and was given the all clear. Felicia then realized that she and Nick weren't going to work out and left for Paris in January 2005.

Felicia returned one year later with a baby son in tow. She believed the baby was Nick's, and hence named him Dominick. However, it was soon revealed that Dominick was, in fact, the product of a one-night stand with Dante Damiano (Antonio Sabàto, Jr.) in Paris, leaving Nick devastated. Felicia's cancer returned and she eventually "died" in her mother's arms. However, a faint heartbeat was detected in the ambulance and her mother Stephanie had Felicia secretly transferred to a private clinic, where she eventually had a liver transplant.  Felicia fought to survive for her child's sake.

Meanwhile, Dante and Bridget, believing that Felicia had indeed died, had begun raising Dominick (who they nicknamed "Dino") as a family. Stephanie eventually revealed to the rest of the family that Felicia was alive. Though ecstatic to have her back, Bridget and Dante prepared to fight Felicia for custody of Dino. Over the next number of weeks, the child bonded together Dante and Felicia instead, and Bridget gave up on Dante.  Dante eventually proposed to Felicia, although he was still in love with Bridget.

On their wedding day, Felicia saw Bridget staring at Dante and a heated confrontation ensued. Bridget then admitted her love for Dante and they temporarily reunited.  When Dante and Bridget eventually split again because of her reluctance to have kids right away, Felicia and Dante were back on.

Several weeks later, Bridget found out she was pregnant. At first, she thought that the baby was the result of a one-night stand with her ex-husband Nick Marone, but further tests concluded that the pregnancy was further along than previously thought, making the unborn baby Dante's child. Dante and Bridget suffered a loss when she revealed she miscarried the child a few weeks later.  This didn't stop Dante and Felicia from rallying to her side.  Despite Bridget stepping aside for Felicia to reunite with Dante, an act which solidified the sisters once more; she now has feelings of animosity towards her son's father, who now lives in Italy, calling him a loser.  She is somewhat allied with Katie Logan (Heather Tom), hoping to end the long-time war that had ensued between their families.  However, relations between her and Eric have suffered because of his relationship with Katie's sister, Donna, and the imminent end of her parents' marriage.  Eric explained to Felicia why he was divorcing her mother, but she still doesn't believe that her mother could do what Eric had said she had.

Recently, she's been traveling to Genoa City to assist Nick Newman (Joshua Morrow) in the launch of Restless Style magazine. While working on the joint campaign, Felicia started flirting with Nick, and recently even joined forces with Nick's half-brother Adam Wilson (Chris Engen) to break up Nick and his wife Phyllis (Michelle Stafford), which proved to be very unsuccessful. Felicia later went back to Los Angeles.

Of late, Felicia has allied herself with her brothers, Thorne and Ridge, to eliminate Donna out of Forrester Creations, because of the supposed bad publicity that the company had received since Eric married Donna (of whom none of them approve of).  Their efforts had been not too well received by Eric, who is angry that his children aren't willing to give Donna a chance. Even their mother Stephanie—whom at one time had no liking for Donna or her sister Brooke—has pleaded with them to drop their animosity toward her and give her a chance, if anything, for their father's sake.

During a business meeting, it was revealed that Marcus Walton (Texas Battle) was indeed Donna's son, and they attempted to use said information to try to drive Donna out of the company, but they were shocked when Eric not only accepted Marcus into the family, but did so because the siblings were only trying to dredge up some scandal, real or fictitious, to get rid of Donna. Donna has since fired her.

After Eric suffered a heart attack, and was revealed to be poisoned, Felicia continued to ally with her brothers in eliminating Donna's presence from their lives. When Eric awoke from his coma, Felicia helped to reunite him with Stephanie; though this reunion proved short-lived as he eventually returned to Donna much to Felicia and her brothers chagrin. Felicia was ultimately reinstated at Forrester Creations.
Felicia was particularly frustrated with her father's choice to name Rick president of the company even though she loves her brother. She saw the Logan family as having far too much influence over her family's business, and came to feel her father didn't even notice her anymore. When it came time for the company to debut its new line, Felicia openly expressed that she partially wished it would fail so that Eric would see the error in allowing the Logan family to have so much power over Forrester Creations.

Before either Forrester Creations or Jackie M had revealed their new lines, Felicia contacted Nick Marone expressing a wish to leave her father's company in favor of Jackie M and even offered to rekindle their romance, despite him being engaged to Katie Logan. It did not happen because Nick was committed to Katie at the time. She returned in 2010 and learned her mother had cancer, and stayed to support the family until Christmas. She again returns in July of the following year for the wedding of Ridge and Taylor—which does not end up happening. Felicia returns in November 2012 for her mother's farewell party, she stays for the funeral and leaves again after spending Christmas with her family. In August 2014, Wyatt Spencer (Darin Brooks), Hope Logan (Kim Matula) and Rick Forrester (Jacob Young) visit Felicia at Forrester Creations Paris, ahead of shooting a new promotion in the city. In September 2016, Felicia returns to help her family to stop Eric and Quinn Fuller (Rena Sofer)'s wedding.

References

The Bold and the Beautiful characters
The Young and the Restless characters
Television characters introduced in 1990
Female characters in television
Crossover characters in television
Fictional characters incorrectly presumed dead